Fallen is a two-part British television crime drama, written by Steve Griffiths and directed by Omar Madha, first broadcast on ITV on 26 April 2004. The drama stars Jonathan Cake as Jason Shepherd, a police detective who wakes up in hospital in an amnesiac state after being subjected to a near fatal electrocution by members of a gang suspected to be involved in nuclear terrorism. Simone Lahbib stars as Shepherd's superior, DCI Kate Gunning, with Kerrie Taylor, Gary Love, David Gant and William Beck also among the principal cast members credited.

The series was also broadcast in Sweden, in Germany under the title Böser Cop, guter Cop (English: Good Cop, Bad Cop) and in France under the title À découvert (English: Discovered). The series was filmed in and around London. The series gathered respectable viewing figures, with the first part gathering 5.92 million viewers, and the second attracting 4.07 million.

Cast

Main
 Jonathan Cake as DS Jason Shepherd
 Simone Lahbib as DCI Kate Gunning
 Kerrie Taylor as Louise Shephard
 Gary Love as DI Tom Beckett
 David Gant as Michael Richard Blaine
 Nicholas Hope as Chief Supt. Edridge
 Niall O'Mara as Wesley Shepherd
 William Beck as Dave Walker
 Fiona Glascott as Clare Woodward
 Lisa Hogg as Stefanie Weir
 Rebecca Sarker as Dr. Nisha Mehta
 Anton Saunders as Reece Reynolds
 Greg Hicks as David Houghton

Supporting
 Barry Aird as DS Tennant
 Gary Powell as DS Gray
 Stanley Townsend as Mara
 Tom Wu as Logan
 Sara Stockbridge as Nina
 James Lailey as Eisner
 Bill Ward as Sykes
 Ryan Pope as Jacket
 Richard Standing as Andy
 Phil Nice as Reeves

Episodes

References

External links

2004 British television series debuts
2004 British television series endings
2000s British drama television series
ITV television dramas
2000s British television miniseries
Television series by ITV Studios
Television shows produced by Meridian Broadcasting
English-language television shows
Television shows set in London